Goa, Daman and Diu Liberation Day (Portuguese: Dia da libertação de Goa; Konkani: गोंय मुक्ति दिस, Goem Mukti Dis; Hindi: गोवा मुक्ति दिवस) is observed on December 19 every year in Goa, India. The Goa Liberation Day is celebrated in commemoration of the Indian armed forces annexing Portuguese-ruled Goa. Also, India was completely free from European rule on this day.

Background 

Goa, an Indian state, was liberated on December 19, 1961, from around 450 years of Portuguese rule. The movement for independence in the 19th century in India had some impact to a lesser extent in Goa also. The residents of Goa also participated in Satyagraha in 1940s. The Portuguese still refused to leave Goa even after India got independence in 1947. The government, though, didn't take any military action then, it held a series of diplomatic talks with Portuguese. After the talks failed, the then-Government of India chose the military option for the liberation of Goa.

Observance   
Various programmes organised across Goa to mark the Goa Liberation Day. In 2021, the observance consisted of a women's parliament and a youth parliament. The Prime Minister of India inaugurated new projects like the Super Specialty Block at the Goa Medical College and Hospital, the renovated Fort Aguada Jail Museum in North Goa, Aviation Skill Development Center at Mopa Airport, the Gas-insulated Substation at Dabolim-Navelim, Margao, and the New South Goa District Hospital.

Operation Vijay 
Operation Vijay was launched to liberate the three Portuguese territories: Goa, Daman and Diu. It was supposedly the first tri-service operation of the Indian armed forces. The Indian government wanted to take the military action from December 1, but it occurred as the 36-hour military operation that began on December 18, 1961, and ended on December 19, 1961.

See also 

 Goa liberation movement
 Annexation of Goa
 History of Goa

References

Culture of Goa
December observances
Observances in India
History of Goa